Lithuania uses an open telephone numbering plan with all phone numbers having nine digits, including the prefix "8", a 1–3 digit area code, and a 5–7 digit subscriber telephone number. The current plan was introduced in stages in 2001–2003, replacing Soviet-legacy area codes and altering some subscriber numbers.

Overview 

Lithuania uses a total of 47 area codes for landline phones, all beginning with 3, 4 or 5. Within same area code, landlines can be dialed without the prefix and the area code.

Area codes for mobile numbers begin with 6, corporate or state institution numbers with 7, toll-free, reverse-charge and shared-cost numbers with 8, and premium-rate numbers with 9.

Network services numbers begin with "1", dialed without a prefix. This includes numbers beginning with "11", reserved for emergency and special services, such as:

 112 – National emergency number
 113 – Non-emergency medical number
 116 xxx – Harmonised services of social value
 117 – Telecommunication helpline
 118 – Directory assistance
 119 – Fault registration

Prefixes

Lithuania uses area code prefix "8", inherited from Soviet times and not changed during the 2002 changeover.

It intends to change the prefix to "0", as used in many European countries. The "0" prefix was not available due to delays rolling out the national emergency line 112, which kept Soviet-legacy emergency numbers 01, 02 and 03 in place until 1 April 2022. In January 2023, Lithuanian authorities announced that the area code prefix would change in December 2025, pending a consultation.

International dialling prefix "00" replaced Soviet-era 8~10 in 2003.

Lithuania uses +370 country calling code since 1993, replacing area code in Soviet-numbering space .

National area codes (with prefix)

 Akmenė: 8425
 Alytus: 8315
 Anykščiai: 8381
 Birštonas: 8319
 Biržai: 8450
 Druskininkai: 8313
 Elektrėnai: 8528
 Ignalina: 8386
 Jonava: 8349
 Joniškis: 8426
 Jurbarkas: 8447
 Kaišiadorys: 8346
 Kaunas: 837
 Kelmė: 8427
 Kėdainiai: 8347
 Klaipėda: 846
 Kretinga: 8445
 Kupiškis: 8459
 Lazdijai: 8318
 Marijampolė: 8343
 Mažeikiai: 8443
 Molėtai: 8383
 Neringa: 8469
 Pakruojis: 8421
 Palanga: 8460
 Panevėžys: 845
 Pasvalys: 8451
 Plungė: 8448
 Prienai: 8319
 Radviliškis: 8422
 Raseiniai: 8428
 Rokiškis: 8458
 Skuodas: 8440
 Šakiai: 8345
 Šalčininkai: 8380
 Šiauliai: 841
 Šilalė: 8449
 Šilutė: 8441
 Širvintos: 8382
 Švenčionys: 8387
 Tauragė: 8446
 Telšiai: 8444
 Trakai: 8528
 Ukmergė: 8340
 Utena: 8389
 Varėna: 8310
 Vilkaviškis: 8342
 Vilnius: 85 
 Visaginas: 8386
 Zarasai: 8385

References

Lithuania
Lithuania communications-related lists